Christopher Allen Green (born February 26, 1909 in Lawrenceburg, Indiana) is a former American football defensive back in the National Football League for the Miami Dolphins and the Buffalo Bills.  He played college football at the University of Illinois.

External links
NFL.com player page National Football League Copyright 2017

1968 births
Living people
People from Lawrenceburg, Indiana
American football defensive backs
Illinois Fighting Illini football players
Miami Dolphins players
Buffalo Bills players